Bishop Timon – St. Jude High School (formerly Bishop Timon High School) is a Roman Catholic Franciscan high school for young men administered and staffed by the Order of Friars Minor  located in South Buffalo, New York. Bishop Timon High School, as it was originally known, was founded in  1946 by the Franciscan Friars.

History
In 1946, the school officially opened its doors with a class of 76 freshmen. For three years, Bishop Timon – St. Jude High School was temporarily housed at Our Lady of Perpetual Help in Buffalo's old First Ward. On September 6, 1949, Timon moved into its current home on McKinley Parkway with an enrollment of approximately 800 young men. In June 1950, Bishop O'Hara awarded diplomas to Bishop Timon's first graduating class. The school was named Bishop Timon after Buffalo's first bishop, John Timon. In 1993, the school added St. Jude to its name.

Bishop Timon High School was founded by Roman Catholic priests of the Franciscan Order Minor, with the idea of providing a quality education at an affordable cost for the largely working-class Irish-American community within the proximity of its South Buffalo neighborhood location. The Franciscan commitment to the needs of the area was the impetus for opening this all-boys college preparatory high-school to the local neighborhood's mostly blue-collar residents.

Campus
The one building campus of the school is located at 601 McKinley Parkway which holds a new 6,000 square foot (540 m2) Center For Media & The Arts. This area maintains a working sound recording studio. It also is home to music and art studios, a graphic design lab, a video production lab, and a photography darkroom. In 2003, Timon High School opened the Science and Pre-Engineering Center. An Advanced Placement Conference & Technology room was also built, allowing the school to use distance learning with other schools through conferencing software.

In 1963 Timon opened a Freshman Annex located on Como Ave. named after Monsignor Nash of Holy Family Parish to accommodate its growing enrollment during its peak years of the 60s and 70s. The Annex closed in 1977.

Clubs and activities
Art club
Chess club
Chorus
Drama Club
International Club
Masterminds
Mock Trial
National Honor Society
P-E-A-C-E Club
Radio Club 
Robotics Club
School Publications
Science Club
Ski and Snowboard Club
Spirit Club
Student Senate

Sports

Alumni
 Erik Bohen - NYS Assemblyman 
 George Breen - Olympic swimmer
 Jim Kelley- Sportswriter
 Whitey Martin - Former NBA player
 Johnny McCarthy - Professional Basketball Coach/Player
 Demone Harris - Professional Football player
 James T. Molloy - Doorkeeper to the United States House of Representatives
 Carl Paladino- Politician/Business Leader
 Jack Quinn - President of Erie Community College
 Mark Schroeder - Comptroller of the City of Buffalo, New York State Assemblymen
 Rickey Williams - Retired NBA player
 Michael P. Kearns - NYS Assemblyman
 Connor Fields - Professional lacrosse player in the Premier Lacrosse League
 Steve Barnes - Attorney, Founding Partner, Cellino & Barnes 
 Christopher P. Scanlon - South District Councilman, Buffalo
 Dennis R. DePerro - President, St. Bonaventure University

Notes and references

Boys' schools in New York (state)
Catholic secondary schools in New York (state)
Educational institutions established in 1946
Roman Catholic Diocese of Buffalo
High schools in Buffalo, New York
1946 establishments in New York (state)